KGFY is a radio station airing a country music format licensed to Stillwater, Oklahoma, broadcasting on 105.5 MHz FM.  The station is owned by Stillwater Broadcasting, LLC.

References

External links
KGFY's official website

Country radio stations in the United States
GFY